Herbert Benson (April 24, 1935 – February 3, 2022) was an American medical doctor, cardiologist, and founder of the Mind/Body Medical Institute at Massachusetts General Hospital (MGH) in Boston. He was a professor of mind/body medicine at Harvard Medical School and director emeritus of the Benson-Henry Institute (BHI) at MGH. He was a founding trustee of The American Institute of Stress. He contributed more than 190 scientific publications and 12 books. More than five million copies of his books have been printed in different languages.

Started in 1998, Benson became the leader of the so-called "Great Prayer Experiment," or technically the "Study of the Therapeutic Effects of Intercessory Prayer (STEP)." The result published in 2006 concluded that intercessory prayer has no beneficial effect on patients with coronary artery bypass graft surgery. He, however, continued to believe that prayer has positive health benefits.

Benson coined relaxation response (and wrote a book by the same title) as a scientific term for the reversion of the physical stress response that can be elicited by meditation, and he used it to describe the ability of the body to stimulate relaxation of muscle and organs.

Biography 
Benson was born on April 24, 1935 in Yonkers, New York. He graduated with B.A. in biology from Wesleyan University in 1957. He entered a medical course at Harvard Medical School and earned his MD degree in 1961. He continued postdoctoral programs at King County Hospital, Seattle; University Hospital, University of Washington, Seattle; National Heart Institute, Bethesda; University of Puerto Rico; and Thorndike Memorial Laboratory, Boston City Hospital. In 1969 he was appointed instructor in physiology and later instructor in medicine at Harvard Medical School. He was promoted to assistant professor of medicine the next year. From 1972 he became associate professor. He was appointed associate professor at the Beth Israel Hospital in 1977, the post he held until 1987. Then he returned to the medical faculty at Harvard. With the establishment of Mind/Body Medical Institute at Harvard in 1992, he became associate professor, and then full professor. He was a practicing physician at Beth Israel Hospital from 1974. Between 1990 and 1997 he was lecturer in medicine and religion at Andover Newton Theological School, Newton Centre.

Benson became founding president of the Mind/Body Medical Institute of Harvard Medical School in 1988. He founded the Benson-Henry Institute for Mind Body Medicine of the Massachusetts General Hospital in 2006, where he became its director.

Benson died from heart disease and kidney failure at Beth Israel Deaconess Medical Center in Boston, on February 3, 2022, at the age of 86.

Notable projects

Mind body medicine 
In the 1960s at Harvard Medical School, Benson pioneered mind-body research, focusing on stress and the relaxation response in medicine. In his research, the mind and body are one system, in which meditation can play a significant role in reducing stress responses. He continued to pioneer medical research into bodymind questions. He introduced the term relaxation response as a scientific alternative for meditation. According to him, relaxation response is the ability of the body to induce decreased activity of muscle and organs. It is an opposite reaction to the fight-or-flight response. With Robert Keith Wallace, he observed that Transcendental Meditation reduced metabolism, rate of breathing, heart rate, and brain activity.

Intercessory prayer 

In 1998, Benson started a research project on the efficacy of prayer among patients undergoing coronary artery bypass graft (CABG) surgery. The project, funded by the John Templeton Foundation, was explicit that its objective was not to prove or disprove the existence of God. This "Study of the Therapeutic Effects of Intercessory Prayer (STEP)" became popularly known as the "Great Prayer Experiment" and was described as "the most intense investigation ever undertaken of whether prayer can help to heal illness." The trial attempted to differentiate among outcomes in three groups of patients: (1) those uncertain of whether they were being prayed for, who were; (2) those uncertain of whether they were being prayed for, who were not; and (3) those being prayed for who were certain of it. The conclusion, published in 2006, was that intercessory prayer has no beneficial effect on CABG patients. Indeed, certainty of receiving intercessory prayer was actually associated with a higher incidence of complications.

Personal life 

Benson married Marilyn Benson, and they had two children, Jennifer and Gregory.

Awards and honours 

Mosby Scholarship Award of Harvard Medical School in 1961
DHL (honorary) from Becker College in 1997, from Lasell College in 2002, and from Massachusetts School of Professional Psychology 2007
Medical Foundation Fellowship during 1967–1969
Fellow of the American College of Cardiology in 1976
Medical Self-Care Award for 1976
Honorary President, Chinese Society of Behavioral Medicine and Biofeedback in 1988
Distinguished Alumnus Award of Wesleyan University in 1992
DPS (honorary) from Cedar Crest College in 2000
Hans Selye Award of 2000
National Samaritan Award from The Samaritan Institute in 2002
Mani Bhaumik Award from The Cousins Center for Psychoneuroimmunology at UCLA, California, in 2009

Publications 

The Relaxation Response, 1975.  
The Mind/Body Effect: How behavioral medicine can show you the way to better health, 1979.  
Beyond the Relaxation Response, 1984
Your Maximum Mind, 1987
'Contributor' - MindScience: An East-West Dialogue Daniel Goleman and Robert A. F. Thurman Editors, Wisdom Publications, 1991.  
The Wellness Book, 1992
Timeless Healing: The Power and Biology of Belief, 1996.  
The Relaxation Response - Updated and Expanded (25th Anniversary Edition), 2000
The Breakout Principle, 2003
Mind Over Menopause, 2004
Mind Your Heart, 2004.  
The Harvard Medical School Guide to Lowering Your Blood Pressure, 2006.  
Relaxation Revolution, 2010.

References

Additional sources 
Benson, Herbert (1976). Steps to Elicit the Relaxation Response. RelaxationResponse.org. From The Relaxation Response. HarperTorch.

Benson, Herbert (1998). Staying Healthy in a Stressful World. PBS Body & Soul with Gail Harris. PBS Online: Beacon Productions. 
Carey, Benedict (2006). Long-Awaited Medical Study Questions the Power of Prayer. Mar 31. New York Times 
Kiesling, Stephen, and T. George Harris (1989). The prayer war - Herbert Benson's research on health benefits of prayer. Oct. Psychology Today.

External links 
Benson-Henry Institute for Mind and Body at The Massachuseets General Hospital

Spirituality emerges as point of debate in mind-body movement
Inner Calm: Benson explains relaxation techniques on Humankind public radio
The Herbert Benson Papers at The Center for the History of Medicine at the Countway Library, Harvard Medical School.
"Meditation changes temperatures" – An article on the Harvard study about Meditation controlling body temperatures.

1935 births
2022 deaths
American medical academics
Wesleyan University alumni
Harvard Medical School alumni
Physicians of Massachusetts General Hospital
Transcendental Meditation researchers
Fellows of the American College of Cardiology
People from Yonkers, New York
Academics from New York (state)
Physicians from New York (state)